Navarone Garibaldi Garcia (born March 1, 1987) is an American musician. He is the frontman of the band Them Guns. Garcia is the son of Priscilla Presley and half-brother of Lisa Marie Presley.

Early life
Garcia was born to actress Priscilla Presley and Marco Garibaldi on March 1, 1987, in Santa Monica, California. As his mother Priscilla was the former wife of Elvis Presley, media scrutiny was often focused on the family. Garcia's half-sister was Lisa Marie Presley, Elvis's only child.

Them Guns
Them Guns is a Los Angeles-based rock band made up of members Garcia (guitar/lead vocals), Kyle Hamood (lead guitar/vocals/keys), Bobby Vega (drums), and Chuck Holiday (bass). Santa Cruz Waves described their sound as "...a rock base, a tinge of surf/ska vocals, and funked out keys, a sound to satisfy the traditional, to alternative, to psychedelic rock music enthusiasts... birthed from the barrels of Them Guns."

Garcia cites his musical influences as "Nine Inch Nails, Nirvana, Kings of Leon to the likes of the Chemical Brothers."

In the United States, Them Guns have had sold out shows at The Viper Room, The Troubadour in West Hollywood and many other rock venues. Their UK debut was on April 4, 2013, at The Kings Head Club in Hoxton, east London. It was the first time that The Kings Head Club had hosted a live band and the show was a private one.

Personal life
Garcia is a reptile lover and collects reticulated pythons and Asian water monitors. On February 15, 2022, he married Elisa Achilli at Schloss Hünigen Hotel in the Emmental Valley, Switzerland.

References

External links
Them Guns Official website

1987 births
Living people
Singers from Los Angeles
21st-century American singers
Presley family
American people of Italian descent
21st-century American guitarists
21st-century American male singers
Musicians from Santa Monica, California
American rock guitarists
American rock singers